Dombühl is a municipality in the district of Ansbach in Bavaria in Germany.

Division of the municipality

Dombühl has eight districts:

References

External links
 

Ansbach (district)